Herminio Sanchez Aquino (April 25, 1949 – July 31, 2021), also known as Hermie Aquino, was a Filipino businessman, politician, and a vice presidential candidate who ran as the running mate of Raul Roco in 2004.

Early life and education
Aquino was born in 1949 in Manila, Philippines to Gen. Servillano "Mianong" Aquino and Belen Sanchez. He was the half-uncle of Benigno Aquino Jr. (Ninoy) and half-grand uncle of former President Benigno Aquino III.

He graduated with honors with a degree of Bachelor of Arts in Economics at the Ateneo de Manila University in 1969.

Career
As a businessman, he held various top-management positions that included vice president of G.A. Machineries Inc. from 1974 to 1981, senior consultant of Management and Investment Development Associates Inc. from 1972 to 1985, and vice president of Circa Nila Development Corp. from 1981 to 1985.

Political life
After the People Power Revolution in 1986, he was invited by his relative by marriage the President Corazon Aquino to join the government. He served as deputy executive secretary and minister of the Ministry of Human Settlements from 1986 to 1987.

Aquino ran for congressman and won as the representative from the 3rd district of Tarlac from 1987 to 1998. Since Philippine laws limit a congressman to serve only for three consecutive terms, he ran as Tarlac provincial vice governor under Margarita "Ting-Ting" Cojuangco, sister-in-law of Corazon Aquino. He won the election and served from 1998 to 2001. He ran again for his second term in 2001 but together with Mrs. Cojuangco, lost to Lakas-NUCD-UMDP candidates.

Post-political life
Aquino returned to private life as a businessman. He became chairman and president of Buenavista Management Corporation which serves as management consultants, financial advisors, and project packagers. He was concurrently the chairman Trackworks Inc., an advertising and retail company  for Metro Rail Transit.

He was the campaign manager and fund raiser for the Aksyon Demokratiko Party. He was invited by Raul Roco to be his running mate for the 2004 elections. He accepted the offer to run for the position of Vice President of the Philippines. However, he gathered less than a million votes and lost to Noli de Castro.

He returned again to private life and his previous position in business.

In 2013 elections, he ran for congressman in 3rd district of Tarlac under the Liberal Party. However, he placed third and lost to Concepcion Mayor Noel Villanueva.

He served as the national chairman of Aksyon Demokratiko.

Personal life and death
Hermie, as many call him, was married to Ma. Victoria Guanzon. Their four children are Servillano II, Paolo Antonio, and Ma. Theresa Belinda and Ma. Camille Corazon.

Aquino died due to complications from cancer on July 31, 2021 at the age of 72.

References

External links
Alyansa ng Pag-asa Website

1949 births
2021 deaths
Ateneo de Manila University alumni
Herminio Aquino
People from Manila
Members of the House of Representatives of the Philippines from Tarlac
Candidates in the 2004 Philippine vice-presidential election
Chairpersons of the Housing and Urban Development Coordinating Council of the Philippines
Corazon Aquino administration cabinet members
Aksyon Demokratiko politicians